Alfonso Ramírez may refer to:

Alfonso Ramírez (count) (died 1185), medieval governor of the Bierzo
Alfonso Lastras Ramírez (1924–1999), Mexican politician
Alfonso Ramírez Cuéllar (born 1959), Mexican politician
Alfonso Ramírez (boxer), Mexican boxer, Boxing at the 1968 Summer Olympics